= Vexed Generation =

British menswear brand

Vexed Generation is a British menswear brand founded by designers Joe Hunter and Adam Thorpe.

Thorpe studied Microbiology at Kingston University and Hunter graduated as a graphic designer from Middlesex University in 1990.

Launched in 1994 the brand produced a range of garments that were designed for and addressed an urban environment and associated environmental issues including air pollution, surveillance, and civil liberties. They used a range of military and technological fabrics including high-tenacity ballistic cloths, and knife-proof and bullet-proof fabrics.

The brand is also known for its creation of a series of conceptual retail spaces and shops from 1994 onwards that questioned the process and function of the fashion retail environment.

in 2003 a partnership with PUMA was announced to create two new apparel lines for Puma, Martial Arts and Urban Mobility, which would be launched for their men's 2004 Autumn Collection and continued for a number of years.

After a number of years working on other partnerships and collaborations, in 2017 it was announced that the brand would create a new range of garments for Autumn/Winter 2018.
